Quinta  is a traditional term for an estate, primarily used in Portugal and the Portuguese-speaking world, but the term has sometimes been borrowed in non-Portuguese speaking countries of Ibero-America.

Definition

A quinta is a primarily rural property, especially those with historic manors and palaces in continental Portugal. The term is also used as an appellation for agricultural estates, such as wineries, vineyards, and olive groves.

In urban contexts, quintas may often be walled-off mansions in city centers, but the term may also be applied to edifices once located in a more rural setting that have since been developed.

The name was later often given to generally larger land estates that might originally have been used for agricultural purposes but were converted into residential estates. 

The term has also been applied to affluent gated communities in Portugal and Lusophone Africa, such as Quinta da Beloura in the Portuguese Riviera or Quinta do Lago in the Algarve.

Notable quintas
Portugal
Quinta da Regaleira, Sintra
Quinta da Ribafria, Sintra
Quinta do Relógio, Sintra
Quinta do Ramalhão, Sintra
Quinta das Lágrimas, Coimbra
Quinta dos Lagares d'El-Rei, Lisbon
Quinta da Boa Hora, Azores

Brazil
Quinta da Boa Vista, Rio de Janeiro

Non-Portuguese speaking countries
 Quinta de Olivos, Argentina

Architecture in Portugal
Architecture in Brazil
Agriculture in Portugal